Ciaonan Street is a historic street in Yanshuei District, Tainan, Taiwan.

Name
Ciaonan means south of the bridge, in which the bridge mentioned crosses a small water body that once formed part of Yuejin Harbor.

History
The road went into decline since 1900 when Yuejin Harbor was closed. In late 2000s, the street was revamped and houses along the road were cleaned up and repainted.

Architecture
Ciaonan Street is the oldest street in Yanshuei. There are hundred years old blacksmith shops and historic buildings along the street.

Transportation
The road is accessible by bus from Xinying Station of Taiwan Railways.

See also
 List of roads in Taiwan
 List of tourist attractions in Taiwan

References

Streets in Taiwan
Transportation in Tainan